Schwarzenegger is a German surname that means person from Schwarzenegg, which is both a village in Switzerland (currently split between the municipalities of Unterlangenegg and Oberlangenegg) and a place in Land Salzburg in Austria.  "Schwarzen" means "black", and "egg" (from the same root as the German word "Ecke" for "corner") refers to a ridge, e.g., Eggli (long ridge), Eggiman (lives on a ridge), and Eggler (farms on a ridge). Thus, the surname can be taken as a counterpart to the English Blackridge. Notable people with the surname include:

Arnold Schwarzenegger (born 1947), Austrian-American former bodybuilder, film actor, and politician
Christian Schwarzenegger (born 1959), Swiss academic and professor of criminal law at University of Zurich, second-cousin of Arnold Schwarzenegger
Gustav Schwarzenegger (1907–1972), Austrian police chief, once married to Aurelia Jadrný (1922–1998), father of Arnold Schwarzenegger
Katherine Schwarzenegger (born 1989), American author, daughter of Arnold Schwarzenegger
Patrick Schwarzenegger (born 1993), American entrepreneur, actor and model, son of Arnold Schwarzenegger
 Patrick M. Knapp Schwarzenegger (born 1968), Austrian-American lawyer, son of Meinhard Schwarzenegger, nephew of Arnold Schwarzenegger
Afia Schwarzenegger (born Valentina Nana Agyeiwaa in 1982), Ghanaian media personality

References

German-language surnames